Robert Sims (born December 6, 1983) is a former American football guard in the National Football League (NFL). He was drafted by the Seattle Seahawks in the fourth round of the 2006 NFL Draft. He played college football at Ohio State University.

Professional career

Seattle Seahawks
Sims was drafted by the Seattle Seahawks in the fourth round of the 2006 NFL Draft.

Detroit Lions
On April 5, 2010, Sims was traded to the Detroit Lions for defensive end Robert Henderson. Detroit also sent a 5th-round pick for a 7th-round pick as part of the trade in the 2010 NFL Draft.

Sims was named the 2013 recipient of the Detroit Lions / Detroit Sports Broadcasters Association / Pro Football Writers Association's Media-Friendly "Good Guy" Award. The Good Guy Award is given yearly to the Detroit Lions player who shows consideration to and cooperation with the media at all times during the course of the season.

Personal life
His father, Mickey Sims, also played in the NFL.

Sims is a business partner with former teammate Calvin Johnson in opening several cannabis facilities across the state of Michigan, under the brand name Primitiv.  The pair have also formed a partnership with Harvard University to support medical cannabis research.

References

External links

 Detroit Lions bio
 

1983 births
American football offensive guards
Businesspeople in the cannabis industry
Detroit Lions players
Living people
Ohio State Buckeyes football players
People from Macedonia, Ohio
Players of American football from Ohio
Seattle Seahawks players